Irajá Cecy (born 18 May 1955) is a Brazilian athlete. He competed in the men's high jump at the 1976 Summer Olympics.

References

1955 births
Living people
Athletes (track and field) at the 1976 Summer Olympics
Brazilian male high jumpers
Olympic athletes of Brazil
Place of birth missing (living people)